Ogurtsovo is the name of several rural localities in Russia:
Ogurtsovo, Opochetsky District, Pskov Oblast, a village in Opochetsky District of Pskov Oblast
Ogurtsovo, Ostrovsky District, Pskov Oblast, a village in Ostrovsky District of Pskov Oblast
Ogurtsovo, Tver Oblast, a village in Staromelkovskoye Rural Settlement of Konakovsky District in Tver Oblast